RMAS Newton was an underwater research vessel with limited provision for cable laying. She was originally used for sonar propagation trials.

History
RMAS Newton was built at Scott Lithgow Ltd's yard at Greenock. She had three Mirrlees Blackstone  diesel engines driving GEC generators for propulsion through a single screw and the ship's electrical supply. To aid manouverability at low speed she had a nozzle rudder and a bow thruster. She was launched on 25 June 1975 and taken into service one year later, on 18 June 1976.

In 2000, she underwent a major refit which included replacing her Mirlees engines with Ruston RK 215 units. At the same time her cable handling equipment was removed. Subsequently, she was used as a training and support vessel for special forces. In 2005, she underwent a further refit at Birkenhead.

On 1 April 2008, she was taken over by Serco who operated her until 2010 when she was replaced by SD Victoria. In 2012 she was sent to Ghent for scrapping.

References

Royal Maritime Auxiliary Service
Serco Marine Services (ships)
Ships built in Glasgow
1975 ships